Union Township is a township in Delaware County, Iowa, USA.  As of the 2000 census, its population was 292.

Geography
Union Township covers an area of 29.81 square miles (77.2 square kilometers); of this, 0.01 square miles (0.02 square kilometers) or 0.03 percent is water. The streams of Buck Creek, Lime Creek and Plum Creek run through this township.

Unincorporated towns
 Buck Creek
(This list is based on USGS data and may include former settlements.)

Adjacent townships
 Delhi Township (north)
 South Fork Township (east)
 Castle Grove Township, Jones County (south)
 Boulder Township, Linn County (southwest)
 Hazel Green Township (west)
 Milo Township (northwest)

Cemeteries
The township contains two cemeteries: Buck Creek and Grove Creek.

Major highways

References
 U.S. Board on Geographic Names (GNIS)
 United States Census Bureau cartographic boundary files

External links
 US-Counties.com
 City-Data.com

Townships in Delaware County, Iowa
Townships in Iowa